Manush can refer to:

Heinie Manush (1901-1971), American left fielder in Major League Baseball 
Manush Georgiev (aka Manush Voivoda), Bulgarian revolutionary
Mati O Manush, a pioneering television programme in Bangladesh Television 
Manush, see Romani people in France